The 2019 Italy FIBA Basketball World Cup team represents Italy at the 2019 FIBA Basketball World Cup in China. Italy qualified for the World Cup by taking the 2nd place in the European Second Round Group J. The team has been coached by Romeo Sacchetti.

The 2019 FIBA Basketball World Cup is the 18th tournament of the FIBA Basketball World Cup championship that is organized by FIBA.

Background 
The 2019 FIBA Basketball World Cup represents the 18th edition of the FIBA Basketball World Cup where for the first time 32 teams from all over the world compete in the tournament. Italy has not qualified since the 2006 edition in Japan where it reached the playoffs.
This year, with coach Sacchetti, the Italian national team aims to achieve at least the Olimpics qualifying tournament, which means qualify to the second round of World Cup.

Timeline 
 22 February 2019: Italy gains mathematical qualification to the world cup after winning against Hungary 75-41.
 16 March 2019: World Cup 2019 Draw: Italy is in group D together with Angola, Philippines and Serbia.
 1 July 2019: Submitted the 24 players long list preliminary convocation.
 12 July 2019: Submitted 19 players convocation for the summer preparation (Polonara, Pascolo, Flaccadori, Tonut and Moretti will not join the team for the World Cup preparation).
 22 July 2019: Start of the training camp.
 30 July 2019 - 26 August 2019: Friendly games.
 30 July 2019 - 31 July 2019: Trentino Basket Cup.
 8 August 2019 - 10 August 2019: Verona Basketball Cup.
 11 August 2019: 16 men roster cut (Cinciarini, M. Vitali and Moraschini leave the team).
 13 August 2019: Melli will not be part of the team due to a knee surgery.
 16 August 2019 - 18 August 2019: Acropolis Basketball Tournament.
 17 August 2019: 14 men cut (Aradori leaves the team).
 23 August 2019 - 27 August 2019: Austiger Cup.
 29 August 2019: Final roster announced.
 31 August 2019 - 15 September 2019: 2019 FIBA Basketball World Cup

Kit 
Supplier: Spalding / Sponsor: Barilla

Qualification

First round

Matches 

{{basketballbox collapsible
 | date = 26 February 2018 | time = 19:45 (CET)
 | report = Boxscore
 | teamA =     | scoreA =     50
 | teamB =  | scoreB = 101
 | Q1 = 12-35 | Q2 = 13-12 | Q3 = 11-29 | Q4 = 14-25
 | points1   = Cățe 15
 | rebounds1 = Cățe 8
 | assist1   = Mandache, Kuti 4
 | rating1   = Cățe 23
 | points2   = Della Valle 29
 | rebounds2 = Burns 8
 | assist2   = Filloy 6
 | rating2   = Della Valle 28
 | arena     = BT Arena |place = Cluj-Napoca, Romania | attendance = 5,370
 | referee   = Antonio Conde (ESP), Sergiy Chebyshev (UKR), Marko Vladic (AUT)
 | stack     = yes
}}

 Second round 

 Matches 

 Roster 

The final 12-man roster was announced on 29 August. Originally Nicolò Melli was included as well, but he was ruled out on the World Cup because of his knee surgery.

The teams are referred to the season 2018–19.
 Depth chart 
   

 Candidate players 
The following were candidates to make the team:

 Staff 

Age – describes age on 31 August 2019

Source: 

 Exhibition games 

 Trentino Basket cup 

Four teams took part in the Trentino Basket Cup: Ivory Coast and Italy, that were preparing for the World Cup. While Romania and Switzerland were preparing for the Eurobasket 2021.

 Verona Basketball Cup 
All the four team playing at the Verona Basketball Cup have been qualified for the World Cup: Italy, Russia, Senegal and Venezuela. The tournament is played in a round robin Format and the Russian team won the competition.

 Acropolis Cup 

The tournament is scheduled to be held from 16 to 18 August in Athens, Greece.

 AusTiger Cup 

The tournament is scheduled to be held from 23 to 27 August in Shenyang, China.

 Tournament 

 Preliminary round 

Italy was drawn into Group D with Angola, Philippines, and the Serbia and will play all of its group phase matches in Foshan at the Foshan International Sports and Cultural Center from 31 August to 4 September. All times are local (UTC+8). Philippines vs. Italy 
This will be the second game between the Philippines and Italy in the World Cup. The Italians won the first meeting in 1978, which was also the last competitive game between the two teams.

 Top Performer: Danilo Gallinari

 Italy vs. Angola 
This will be the second game between Angola and Serbia in the World Cup. The Italians won the first meeting in 1990, which was also the last competitive game between the two teams.

 Top Performer: Jeff Brooks

 Italy vs. Serbia 
This will be the first game between Italy and Serbia in the World Cup. Serbia won in its last competitive game against Italy, in EuroBasket 2017.

 Top Performer: Bogdan Bogdanović

 Second round 

Italy finished second in the preliminary group and advanced to the second round of the FIBA Basketball World Cup. It will play against two top finishers of Group C, Spain and Puerto Rico, in Wuhan.All times are local UTC+8.''

 Spain vs. Italy 

 Top Performer: Danilo Gallinari

 Puerto Rico vs. Italy 

 Top Performer:''' Marco Belinelli

Statistics

Individual statistics

Statistical leaders 
Updated:

Individual game highs 

 1– at least 5 attempts

Team game highs

Conclusion 
Italy ended the championship at the 10th place overall, position that allows Italy the qualification to the Olympic qualifying tournament.

References

External links 
Official website
2019 FIBA Basketball World Cup Profile at FIBA Website

 
2019